Secret Princes is an American reality television series that premiered on TLC on September 21, 2012. It chronicles the adventures of several members of international nobility as they leave their home countries to live, work and look for love in America. In addition, to guarantee that they are loved for their true selves and not for their wealth or status, they go undercover as ordinary locals in Atlanta, Georgia during the first season and in Austin, Texas during the second season. Season 2 premiered on TLC on October 25, 2013.

Background
Production crews follow participants as they embark on a journey to achieve their fairytale romance while embracing American culture in the United States. During their pursuit of love, they are forced to leave their servants behind and learn to cook, clean and shop for themselves. They accomplish this by taking menial jobs such as busboys, waiters and dog groomers. Even more revealing is their struggle to adapt to the American working culture. They take these measures in order to fit in and find the perfect woman for each of them.

Cast

Season 1
 Francisco de Borbón y Hardenberg (b. 1979). Resides in Madrid, Spain. Direct male-line descendant of Spanish and French royalty of the House of Bourbon. He is the only son of the 5th Duke of Seville, who is a Grandee of Spain and a relative of the Spanish royal family. Francisco's ancestor, the 1st Duke of Seville, was the grandson of King Charles IV of Spain, who descended from King Louis XIV of France. Francisco's mother was Countess Beatrice von Hardenberg (1947–2020). She was the daughter of Princess Maria Josepha of Fürstenberg and Count Günther von Hardenberg {de}, whose family tree includes Prince Karl August von Hardenberg, a prime minister of Prussia. Francisco attended The American School of Madrid and then Barry University in Miami Shores, Florida, where he studied business and sports management.  Francisco is an entrepreneur who travels frequently. He is involved with ASAP Group S.L., a company that specializes in sports marketing and media projects, with offices in Madrid and Miami. Francisco is an animal lover and has a dog named Snifferson. In this television series, Francisco used the undercover name "Cisco". He met a single mother named Camille Morone. They went to the zoo and had a romantic picnic before he decided to invite her to the ball and reveal his pedigree. She joined him in Spain, where she met his mother. The couple decided that they wanted to see each other again.
 Salauddin Babi of Balasinor (b. 1979). Resides in Gujarat, India. He is the only son of Muhammad Salabat Khan, the current Nawab of the former princely state of Balasinor in India. Salauddin has the title of Nawabzada of Balasinor, and he was educated at the Rajkumar College, Rajkot. His family's home is the Garden Palace in Balasinor, which was built in 1883 and contains around 70 rooms. In this television series, Salauddin used the undercover name "Sal". He chose a lawyer named Alison Langley and took her to India after disclosing his identity, but she decided not to continue their relationship. His parents have begun the arranged marriage process.
 Robert Jonathan Walters, Lord of the Manor of Fullwood (b. 1982). Resides in London, England. He is routinely described as 'Lord Robert Walters' throughout the series, which is incorrect. He claims the title of Lord of the Manor of Fullwood as an inheritance from his uncle. Robert had a strong interest in acting and entertainment from an early age. He attended a drama school in London, which led to leading roles in amateur theatrical productions. He was scouted by a British modelling agency and began an extensive modelling career. This later led him into television presenting, and he has appeared on a number of television shows. In this television series, Robert used the undercover name "Tate". He met Jasmine Bishop, a pharmaceutical sales rep, early on. They bonded over Shakespeare and swimming together with whale sharks at the Georgia Aquarium. He also met a dolphin trainer named Molly and went on two dates with her. He chose to reveal his true identity to Jasmine and invited her to his family's villa in Marbella, Spain, where she met his step-brother. In the end, he asked Jasmine to extend her stay in Europe. He said that because of Jasmine, he had even more of a reason to move to America and couldn't wait to visit her home and family in Andalusia, Alabama. The couple decided to continue their relationship, but they later broke up. In Season 2 of this television series, Robert appears in several episodes.
 The Honourable Ludovic Watson (b. 1989). Resides in Yorkshire, England. His father is the Right Honourable Miles Watson, 4th Baron Manton in the Peerage of the United Kingdom. However, Ludovic has an older brother named Thomas who is the heir apparent and is most likely to become the next Lord Manton. One of the family's ancestors is Sir Marmaduke Langdale, 1st Baron Langdale of Holme, who was a prominent Royalist military commander during the English Civil War. Ludovic lives at his family's country house, Houghton Hall, Yorkshire, which dates back to the 1760s. It is set in an estate of thousands of acres and was once the seat of the (now extinct) Barony of Langdale. He attended the prestigious Oundle School, which was founded in 1556, and he enjoys hunting, shooting, fishing and skiing. In this television series, Ludovic used the undercover name "Waldo". He met Melissa Braden at a nail salon and decided to disclose his pedigree to her at the ball. She visited him in England, where she did not get along with his aristocratic friends. Melissa told him that they were not a match, and they did not continue their relationship.

Season 2
 Francis Alexander Mathew (b. 20 Sep. 1979). Resides in England. Direct descendant (through his mother) of the Russian imperial House of Romanov. He is the son of Thomas Mathew and Princess Olga Andreevna Romanoff. She is the daughter of the late Prince Andrei Alexandrovich of Russia, who was the grandson of Tsar Alexander III and the eldest nephew of the last Tsar, Nicholas II. Known professionally as Francis Mathew, he is a freelance professional photographer and has contributed to a number of magazines worldwide. He travels a lot and has worked on photo assignments in such places as Cameroon, India and Russia. His mother lives at Provender House, which was built starting in 1342 and is located in Kent, England. He is an active outdoorsman and enjoys keeping fit, rock climbing and reading. In this television series, he initially uses the name "Clint" as his undercover name, then later uses the name "Tom".
 Lorenzo Maria Raimondo de' Medici in Campitelli di Calabria (b. 1975). Resides in Rome, Italy. He claims descent from the House of Medici and originally comes from the town of Martirano in the south of Italy. He is the son of Alessandro de' Medici and his wife Krystyna, who live in Calabria, Italy. The main ruling Medici family died out in the 15th century, shortly after the death of Lorenzo the Magnificent. Lorenzo enjoys cooking and speaks several languages. His interests include the arts, charity work and family causes. Lorenzo spends his time working with several charities and is interested in pursuing a political career. In this television series, he uses the names "Dean" and "Dino" as his undercover names.
 The Right Honourable James Rodd, Lord Rennell (b. 1978). Resides in London, England. He is the 4th Baron Rennell in the Peerage of the United Kingdom. He inherited this title in 2006 from his late father, Tremayne Rodd, 3rd Baron Rennell, who was a notable rugby player and later a businessman and politician. The current Lord Rennell grew up in London and attended a boarding school. He is a marketing expert who works for an event planning company. He has travelled extensively and enjoys playing tennis, squash, skiing and surfing. In this television series, he uses the name "Sam" as his undercover name.
 The Honourable Oliver Plunkett (b. 1985). Resides in County Meath, Ireland. He is the second son of the late Edward Plunkett, 20th Baron of Dunsany in the Peerage of Ireland, and great-grandson of the noted novelist Edward Plunkett, 18th Baron of Dunsany. Oliver is the heir presumptive of his elder brother, Randal, who is the current Baron of Dunsany and a film director and producer. Oliver lives at his family's ancient castle in Ireland, Dunsany Castle and Demesne, which is more than 800 years old. He is named after Saint Oliver Plunkett, who was a 17th-century Archbishop of Armagh. Oliver is a computer game designer and runs a company called Dunsany Interactive. He has a dog named Commander Chow and enjoys playing croquet, video games and skiing. In this television series, he uses the name "Luke" as his undercover name.

Episodes

Season 1 (2012)

Season 2 (2013)

See also
 Undercover Princesses
 Undercover Princes

References

2010s American reality television series
2012 American television series debuts
2013 American television series endings
English-language television shows
Television shows set in Atlanta
TLC (TV network) original programming